Trouble Magnet (2006) is a science fiction novel by American writer Alan Dean Foster. The book is the twelfth chronologically in the Pip and Flinx series.

Although he is supposed to be searching for the planet-sized Krang weapons platform in the uninhabited Sagittarius sector, Flinx finds himself sidetracked once again to a new planet, Visaria. On the planet he gets mixed up in the affairs of a youth gang and the local criminal mob and discovers yet another bit of information about himself.

External links

Alan Dean Foster homepage

2006 American novels
2006 science fiction novels
American science fiction novels
Humanx Commonwealth
Novels by Alan Dean Foster
Sequel novels
Del Rey books